These Electric Pages Have Been Unplugged is an acoustic album by Canadian rock band Parabelle. Including 4 acoustic tracks from A Summit Borderline/A Drop Oceanic, 3 acoustic tracks from Reassembling the Icons, 2 new tracks, and 1 track - "Q" , which was previously released by Kevin Matisyn's former band Evans Blue on the 2007 Album The Pursuit Begins When This Portrayal of Life Ends. It was released on May 24, 2011.

Track listing

References

2011 albums
Parabelle albums